Barnett, Haynes & Barnett was a prominent architectural firm based in St. Louis, Missouri.  Their credits include many familiar St. Louis landmarks, especially a number related to the local Catholic church.  Their best-known building is probably the Cathedral Basilica of St. Louis (the 'new' cathedral).  A number of the firm's works are listed on the U.S. National Register of Historic Places.

The three partners were Thomas P. Barnett, John Ignatius Haynes, and George Dennis Barnett. The Barnetts were sons of English-born St. Louis architect George I. Barnett, and Haynes was George D. Barnett's wife's brother. The founding of the firm dates to about 1895; George D. Barnett died in 1922, and the last structure attributed to the firm dates to about 1930.

Work 

Their designs include:

 Rockcliffe Mansion, 1000 Bird St., Hannibal, Missouri, 1898–1900 (Barnett, Haynes & Barnett), NRHP-listed
 Kingsbury Place, private place entry gates and three of the mansions (#3, #7, and #11), 1902
 Loretto Academy, Kansas City, Missouri, 1902
 Palace of Liberal Arts, Louisiana Purchase Exposition, St. Louis, 1904 (temporary)
 Hotel Jefferson, 415 N. Tucker Blvd. St. Louis, MO, 1904 (Barnett, Haynes & Barnett), NRHP-listed
 St. Ann's Orphan Asylum, St. Louis, 1904 (razed circa 1978)
 Mark Twain Hotel, 200 S. Main St. Hannibal, MO, 1905 (Barnett, Haynes & Barnett), NRHP-listed
 St. John's Mercy Hospital Building, 620 W. Scott Springfield, MO, 1906 (razed circa 1970) (Barnett, Haynes and Barnett, et al.), NRHP-listed
 Bank of New York Building, New York, 1907 (razed 1932)
 Marquette Hotel, 1734 Washington Ave. St. Louis, MO, 1907, NRHP-listed
 Connor Hotel, Joplin, Missouri, 1908
 Himmelberger and Harrison Building, 400 Broadway Cape Girardeau, MO, 1908 (Barnett, Haynes and Barnett), NRHP-listed
 Immaculate Conception / St. Henry's Church, St. Louis, 1908
 Congregation Temple Israel, one of the institutions at the Holy Corners Historic District, St. Louis, 1908
 Illinois Athletic Club, 112 S. Michigan Avenue, Chicago, 1908 
 Connor Hotel, Joplin, Missouri, 1908
 Hotel Stratford, 229 Market St. Alton, IL, 1909 (Barnett, Haynes & Barnett), NRHP-listed
 the former Loretto Academy, 3407 Lafayette Avenue, St. Louis, MO, 1909 (Barnett, Haynes & Barnett), NRHP-listed
 Lenox Hall, University City, St. Louis, 1910 
 Adolphus Hotel, 1315 Commerce St. Dallas, TX, 1912 (Barnett, Haynes and Barnett), NRHP-listed
 Brockman Building, 520 W. 7th St. and 708 S. Grand Ave. Los Angeles, CA, 1912 (Barnett, Haynes and Barnett), NRHP-listed
 Cathedral Basilica of St. Louis, St. Louis, 1912
 Busch Mausoleum, Bellefontaine Cemetery, St. Louis, 1915
 Post-Dispatch building, 1139 Olive Street, St. Louis, 1916, NRHP-listed
 Cathedral of St Patrick, El Paso, Texas, 1916
 Saint Clement Catholic Church, Chicago, 1917–1918
 McFarlin Building, 11 E. 5th St Tulsa, OK, 1918 (Barnett-Haynes-Barnett), NRHP-listed
 Little Sisters of the Poor Home for the Aged, 1400 18th Ave., S. Nashville, TN, 1919 (Barnett, Haynes and Barnett), NRHP-listed
 Crestview Manor, residence in the Buena Vista Park Historic District, Tulsa, OK, 1919 (Barnett, Haynes, Barnett), NRHP-listed
 Arcade Building, St. Louis, 1919
 Hotel Claridge, 109 N. Main St. Memphis, TN, 1924 (Barnett, Haynes & Barnett with Memphis architects Jones & Furbringer), NRHP-listed
 Jefferson Arms Apartments, St. Louis, 1928
 B'Nai Israel Synagogue, Cape Girardeau, Missouri, 1937

Additional works by the firm, in alphabetical rather than chronological order, are (with variations in attribution):
 Colonial Hotel, Springfield, Missouri
 Hamilton Hotel, St. Louis
 Immaculate Conception Church and Rectory, 312 Lafayette Ave. St. Louis, MO (Barnett, Haynes, Barnett), NRHP-listed
 Loretto Academy, 1111 W. 39th St. Kansas City, MO (Barnett, Haynes & Barnett), NRHP-listed
 Martin Shaughnessy Building, 2201-15 Washington Ave. St. Louis, MO (Barnett, Haynes & Barnett), NRHP-listed
 St. Mark the Evangelist Catholic Church, Convent and Academy, 1313 Academy Ave. & 5100 Minerva Ave. St. Louis, MO (Barnett & Haynes; Kennerty & Isedell), NRHP-listed
 Southern Hotel, Chicago
 Star Building, St. Louis
 Robert Henry Stockton House, 3508 Samuel Shepard Dr. St. Louis, MO (Barnett & Haynes; Barnett, Haynes & Barnett), NRHP-listed
 Waterman Place-Kingsbury Place--Washington Terrace Historic District, Bounded by Union Blvd., alley S of Waterman Place, Belt Ave., alley S of Kingsbury Place, Clara Ave., alley line bet St. Louis (Independent City), MO (Barnett, Haynes & Barnett), NRHP-listed
 One or more properties in Hamilton Place Historic District, 5900-6000 blocks of Enright, Cates, and Clemens St. Louis, MO (Barnett, Haynes & Barnett), NRHP-listed

References

External links 
 emporis listing of commissions

Architecture firms based in Missouri
Architects of Roman Catholic churches
Architecture of St. Louis